The following ships of the Indian Navy have been named for Bombay:

 is a  guided-missile destroyer, commissioned in 2001

See also
 

Indian Navy ship names